Michael Thomas Stenson (December 18, 1838 – April 28, 1912) was a Canadian politician.

Born in Longford, County Meath, Ireland, the son of John Stenson, Stenson moved with his family to Canada in 1840 settling in Lower Canada. He was educated at St. Mary's College, Montreal where he took a classical course, and at Sainte-Anne-de-la-Pocatière, where he took a course in agriculture. In May 1864, he obtained certificate from Military School at Montreal. He was a farmer, school teacher, was a Public School Inspector. He was Mayor of Wotton Township and Warden of Wolfe County. He was elected to the House of Commons of Canada for the electoral district of Richmond—Wolfe in the general elections of 1896. A Liberal, he did run in 1900.

References
 
 Personnel of the Senate and House of Commons, eighth Parliament of Canada, elected June 23, 1896

1838 births
1912 deaths
Irish emigrants to pre-Confederation Quebec
Liberal Party of Canada MPs
Mayors of places in Quebec
Members of the House of Commons of Canada from Quebec
Politicians from County Longford
Immigrants to Upper Canada